Act of Defiance is an American heavy metal supergroup from Los Angeles, California, formed in 2014 by guitarist Chris Broderick and drummer Shawn Drover of Megadeth after they both resigned from the band on the same day, vocalist Henry Derek (ex-Scar the Martyr and ex-Thrown into Exile) and bassist Matt Bachand (Shadows Fall guitarist and current Living Wreckage bassist).

Discography

Studio albums

 Birth and the Burial (2015)
 Old Scars, New Wounds (2017)

Music videos

 "Throwback" (2015)
 "Refrain and Re-Fracture" (2015)
 "Legion of Lies" (2015)
 "M.I.A" (2017)
 "Overexposure" (2017)
 "The Talisman" (2017)

Band members
 Henry Derek – lead vocals (2014–present)
 Chris Broderick – guitars, backing vocals (2014–present)
 Matt Bachand – bass, backing vocals (2014–present)
 Shawn Drover – drums, percussion (2014–present)

References

External links
 Metal Blade Records

Heavy metal musical groups from California
Musical groups established in 2014
Metal Blade Records artists
2014 establishments in California